The Ponte das Taipas is a deck slab bridge across the Ave River in Caldas das Taipas, Portugal. Contrary to some sources which classify the structure as a Roman bridge, it was built in the modern age.

References

External links 

 

Bridges in Braga District
Stone bridges
Buildings and structures in Guimarães
National monuments in Braga District
Bridges over the Ave River